Marcus Aurelius Nigrinianus, known in English as Nigrinian (d. 284/285) was a grandson of Roman emperor Carus who died young and was deified by Carus' eldest son Carinus. He was the last family member of an emperor to be deified posthumously.

Biography
Nigrinian is generally assumed to be a child of Carus eldest son emperor Carinus since the coins commemorating him were issued by Carinus, but he could have been the child of Carus younger son emperor Numerian or their sister Paulina. A now lost inscription from the Forum Romanum set up for him by Carinus's perfectissimus rationalis Gemimius Festus only stated Divo Nigriniano nepoti Cari (divine Nigrinianus grandson of Carus) and not who he was the son of. Because of his historian John Kent believes that it is unlikely that he was the son of either of Carinus or Numerian.

It has been speculated that he was born around mid-October 284. He is presumed to have died in childhood in late 284 or early 285. After his death he was given divine status.

Research
Before the discovery of the dedicatory epigraph for a statue set up for him by Festus to it was sometimes conjectured that Nigrinianus was the son of the usurper Lucius Domitius Alexander who revolted in 311 AD.

References

Sources
 Prosopographia Imperii Romani p. 360.

External links

 Overview of coins of Nigrinianus
 Coins of the Caran dynasty including Nigrinianus

280s deaths
3rd-century Romans
Deified Roman people
Aurelii
Sons of Roman emperors
Caran dynasty
Royalty and nobility who died as children
284 births